The slaty monarch (Mayrornis lessoni) is a species of bird in the family Monarchidae endemic to Fiji. Its natural habitat is subtropical or tropical moist lowland forests.

Taxonomy and systematics
The slaty monarch was originally described in the genus Rhipidura. Alternate names include cinereous flycatcher, Fiji flycatcher, Fiji slaty flycatcher, slaty flycatcher (an alternate name shared with the Vanikoro monarch) and white-tipped slaty flycatcher.

Subspecies
There are two subspecies recognized:
 M. l. lessoni - (G.R. Gray, 1846): found in western and central Fiji Islands
 M. l. orientalis - Mayr, 1933: found in eastern Fiji Islands

References

Mayrornis
Endemic birds of Fiji
Birds described in 1846
Taxa named by George Robert Gray
Taxonomy articles created by Polbot